The women's 1500 metres races of the 2013–14 ISU Speed Skating World Cup 6, arranged in the Thialf arena, in Heerenveen, Netherlands, was held on 14 March 2014.

Ireen Wüst of the Netherlands won the race, while Lotte van Beek of the Netherlands came second, and Yuliya Skokova of Russia came third.

Result
The race took place on Friday, 14 March, scheduled at 16:16.

Division A

References

Women 1500
6